Ebblake Bog is a  biological Site of Special Scientific Interest  in Dorset and Hampshire, located west of Ringwood. It is part of Dorset Heathlands Ramsar site and Special Protection Area, and of Dorset Heaths Special Area of Conservation,

This mire in the valley of the Moors River has a deep layer of peat. It is dominated by willow, bog myrtle, purple moor grass and Sphagnum mosses and there are several shallow pools.

References

 

Sites of Special Scientific Interest in Hampshire
Sites of Special Scientific Interest in Dorset